Georges St-Pierre (born May 19, 1981) is a Canadian actor and former professional mixed martial artist. He is widely regarded as one of the greatest fighters in mixed martial arts (MMA) history. St-Pierre was a two-division champion in the Ultimate Fighting Championship (UFC), having won titles in the welterweight and middleweight divisions.

St-Pierre is a three-time former UFC Welterweight Champion, having won the title twice and the interim title once between November 2006 and April 2008. St-Pierre was ranked as the #1 welterweight in the world for several years by Sherdog and numerous other publications. In 2008, 2009 and 2010 he was named the Canadian Athlete of the Year by Rogers Sportsnet. Fight Matrix lists him as the top MMA welterweight of all time and most accomplished fighter in MMA history.

He retired as the reigning Welterweight Champion in December 2013, having held the record for most wins in title bouts and the second longest combined title streak in UFC history (2,204 days) while defending his title nine consecutive times. He returned to the Octagon in November 2017 at UFC 217, when he defeated Michael Bisping by submission to win the Middleweight title, thus becoming the fourth fighter in the history of the UFC to be a multi-division champion. He relinquished the title a few weeks later citing health reasons and officially retired from MMA.

Early life

St-Pierre, a Québécois, was born in Saint-Isidore, Montérégie, Quebec, to Roland and Pauline St-Pierre on May 19, 1981. St-Pierre has two younger sisters. St-Pierre had a difficult childhood, attending a school where others would steal his clothes and money. As a child he played hockey, skated and participated in several sports. He began learning Kyokushin Karate at age seven to defend himself against a school bully.  He took up wrestling, Brazilian Jiu-Jitsu and boxing after his Karate teacher died when he was around 16 years old. St-Pierre attended high school at École Pierre-Bédard where he held the school record for number of chin-ups done. After graduation he enrolled in kinesiology studies at Cégep Édouard-Montpetit. Before turning pro as a mixed martial artist, St-Pierre worked as a bouncer at a Montreal night club in the South Shore called Fuzzy Brossard and as a garbageman for six months to pay for his school fees. Already a 2nd dan Kyokushin karate black belt at age 12, his first professional fight was at age 20.

As a youth, St-Pierre was inspired by Jean-Claude Van Damme, and described fighting him in the film Kickboxer: Vengeance as "a dream come true".

Training

St-Pierre has trained with a number of groups in a large variety of gyms throughout his fighting career. Prior to his fight with B.J. Penn at UFC 58, he trained at the Renzo Gracie Jiu-Jitsu Academy in New York City. St-Pierre received his brown belt in BJJ from Renzo Gracie on July 21, 2006. In September 2008, St-Pierre earned his black belt in Brazilian jiu-jitsu under Bruno Fernandes.

St-Pierre began training with Rashad Evans, Nathan Marquardt, Keith Jardine, Donald Cerrone and other mixed martial arts fighters at Greg Jackson's Submission Fighting Gaidojutsu school in New Mexico. Some of Jackson's students accompanied St-Pierre to Montreal to help prepare him for his fight at UFC 94 against B.J. Penn at the Tristar Gym, including Keith Jardine, Nathan Marquardt, Donald Cerrone, and Rashad Evans. Georges' strength and conditioning coach is Jonathan Chaimberg of Adrenaline Performance Centre in Montréal. Georges' Head Trainer is Firas Zahabi of Zahabi MMA, out of the Tristar gym. The two have cornered all of St-Pierre's most recent bouts and remain as his close friends. Between 2006 and 2009, St-Pierre trained in Muay Thai under Phil Nurse at the Wat in New York City.

Mixed martial arts career

Ultimate Fighting Championship

Early fights, ADCC Submission Wrestling World Championship and The Ultimate Fighter
St-Pierre made his Ultimate Fighting Championship (UFC) debut at UFC 46, where he defeated highly ranked Karo Parisyan by unanimous decision (29–28, 30–27, and 30–27). His next fight in the UFC was against Jay Hieron at UFC 48. St-Pierre defeated Hieron via technical knockout in only 1:42 of the first round.

Following his second win in the UFC, he faced Matt Hughes at UFC 50 for the vacant UFC Welterweight Championship. Despite a competitive performance against the much more experienced fighter, St-Pierre tapped out to an armbar with only 10 seconds remaining in the first round. The loss was the first of St-Pierre's career and he has since admitted that he was in awe of Hughes going into the title bout.

After his loss to Matt Hughes, St-Pierre rebounded with a win over Dave Strasser at TKO 19 by a first-round kimura submission. He then returned to the UFC to face Jason Miller at UFC 52, defeating Miller by unanimous decision (30–27, 30–27, and 30–27).

A month after UFC 52, St-Pierre decided to participate in the biggest grappling tournament in the world in the under 77 kg division. In his first fight participation in the ADCC Submission Wrestling World Championship he faced Otto Olson (Trials champion and ADCC 2003 silver medalist beating names like Daniel Moraes, in the Trials final and in the first fight of the ADCC tournament, Fernando Augusto and Cris Brown). St-Pierre won on points showing superiority in Wrestling.
In his second fight, St-Pierre faced Leonardo Silva Dos Santos: bronze (2000) and silver (2001) medalist of the World IBJJF Jiu-Jitsu Championship and was defeated in a flying armbar at 50 seconds into the fight.

St-Pierre was then matched up against top contender Frank Trigg at UFC 54. St-Pierre controlled the fight and eventually sneaked in a rear-naked choke with less than a minute remaining in the first round. He then faced future lightweight champion Sean Sherk at UFC 56. Midway through the second round, St-Pierre became the second fighter to defeat Sherk and the first to finish him.  During the post-fight interview, he famously went down on his knees with an impassioned plea to UFC management to give him another title shot.

At UFC 58, St-Pierre defeated former UFC welterweight champion B.J. Penn to become the No. 1 contender for the UFC welterweight title. St-Pierre won the match by split decision and was set for a rematch against then-champion Matt Hughes at UFC 63. St-Pierre was forced to withdraw from the match, however, due to a groin injury and was replaced by the man he defeated in March, B.J. Penn. The UFC announced afterward that St-Pierre would have the opportunity to fight for the title when his condition was fully healed.

St-Pierre was seen as a trainer on The Ultimate Fighter 4: The Comeback on Spike TV, which featured fighters who were previously seen in UFC events including Matt Serra, Shonie Carter, Pete Sell, Patrick Côté, and Travis Lutter. St-Pierre was seen vocally supporting fellow Canadian and training partner Patrick Côté during the season's airing.

Winning and losing the Welterweight Championship
At UFC 63, St-Pierre made an appearance to support fellow Canadian David "The Crow" Loiseau. At that time he was seen pushing Loiseau to "fight his fight" against Mike Swick. At the same event, after Matt Hughes had defeated B.J. Penn, St-Pierre stepped into the cage to hype up his upcoming title fight against Hughes, stating that he was glad that Hughes won his fight, but that he was "not impressed" by Hughes' performance.

According to both commentator Joe Rogan and Hughes' own autobiography, Hughes was unhappy with St-Pierre's statement. Hughes said that they "had words" off-camera shortly after, at which time St-Pierre apologized, saying he had misunderstood something Hughes had said on the microphone and did not mean to offend him. St-Pierre challenged Matt Hughes again at UFC 65 for the UFC Welterweight Championship. The fight was almost stopped near the end of the first round when St-Pierre sent Hughes to the mat with a superman punch and left hook, but Hughes managed to survive the first round. In the second round, St-Pierre won the fight via technical knockout after a left kick to Hughes' head followed by a barrage of unanswered punches and elbows. After the fight, on January 30, 2007, St-Pierre signed a new six-fight deal with the UFC.

At UFC 69 in 2007, St-Pierre suffered only his second (and last, as of his official retirement in 2019) loss in MMA, when he lost the welterweight title to The Ultimate Fighter 4 winner Matt Serra when Serra forced the referee to step in after a series of unanswered strikes at 3:25 of round one. Matt Serra was an 11–1 underdog going into the bout.
St-Pierre has said that he lost the match partially due to a lack of focus because of problems in his personal life, including the death of a close cousin and his father's serious illness, and later parted ways with his manager and most of his entourage. St-Pierre has since gone on to say that he should not have made any excuses and that Serra was simply the better fighter that night.

Championship pursuits

On August 25, 2007, at UFC 74, St-Pierre won a unanimous decision (30–27, 29–28, and 29–28) over Josh Koscheck. He outwrestled Koscheck, who is a four-time Division I NCAA All-American and an NCAA wrestling champion, by scoring takedowns, stopping Koscheck's takedown attempts and maintaining top position throughout most of the fight. Many predicted that Koscheck would outmatch St-Pierre on the ground due to his credentials, but St-Pierre was confident that he was a better wrestler and striker and was more well-versed in submissions than Koscheck.

Before and after the fight, St-Pierre stated his intention to reclaim his lost title, miming the act of placing a championship belt around his waist while still in the octagon. His win over Koscheck had placed him in the No. 1 contender spot for the UFC Welterweight Championship. That fight was to be against the winner of Matt Hughes and Matt Serra. Matt Serra had to pull out of UFC 79 due to a back injury sustained during training, and instead St-Pierre faced Hughes in a rubber match for the interim UFC Welterweight Championship. Hughes was unable to mount any serious offense against St-Pierre, who again showcased his wrestling skills by not only avoiding all of Hughes' takedown attempts but also taking Hughes down at will. In a reversal of their first fight, St-Pierre attempted a kimura on Hughes' right arm, then switched to a straight armbar with fifteen seconds left in the second round. Hughes fought the extension, but was forced to verbally submit at 4:55 of the second round, making St-Pierre the interim Welterweight Champion.

Welterweight Championship unification bout
At UFC 83 on April 19, 2008, St-Pierre fought Matt Serra in a rematch to determine the undisputed UFC welterweight champion. It was the UFC's first event in Canada and was held at the Bell Centre in Montreal, Québec. Instead of starting with strikes, St-Pierre pressed the action early with a takedown and then mixed up his attack, which never allowed Serra the chance to mount a significant offense. In the second round, St-Pierre continued his previous actions and forced Serra into the turtle position and delivered several knees to Serra's midsection. Near the end of round two, the fight was stopped by referee Yves Lavigne with a visibly gassed Serra unable to defend himself from St-Pierre's continuous knee blows or improve his position.

Championship defenses
St-Pierre's first title defense after regaining the belt was against Jon Fitch at UFC 87. Fitch was on a 16-fight winning streak and a victory against St-Pierre would have been Fitch's ninth consecutive UFC win, a new UFC record. St-Pierre defeated Jon Fitch by unanimous decision (50–43, 50–44, and 50–44), scoring multiple devastating strikes and taking the former Purdue wrestling captain down seemingly at will.

The win over Fitch set up one of the most anticipated rematches in UFC history. B.J. Penn entered the octagon after Fitch's loss and challenged St-Pierre to a rematch of their UFC 58 bout from 2006, which had ended in a split-decision victory for St-Pierre. The rematch took place on January 31, 2009, at UFC 94. The first round of the fight was nearly even, with both men exchanging punches and Penn exercising elusive head movement, fast hands, good takedown defense - thwarting all of St-Pierre's take-down attempts. In the ensuing three rounds, however, Penn put forth a lackluster performance. St-Pierre dominated the rest of the bout, scoring the first take-down of the night midway through the second round and from that point on, taking Penn down at will, repeatedly passing his guard, and persistently punishing the Hawaiian with a brutal ground-and-pound attack.

The fight ended after the fourth round when Penn's cornerman, Jason Parillo, requested that the referee stop the fight. Penn failed to attend the post-fight press conference due to hospitalization for injuries. Penn later admitted that he could not recall anything that happened during the 3rd and 4th rounds because "I was probably borderline knocked out or something." During the fight, Penn complained that St-Pierre was too slippery to hold, which led to suspicion about petroleum jelly being illegally applied to St-Pierre's back. The matter was formally investigated by the UFC and Nevada State Athletic Commission upon the request of the Penn camp. Dana White said it was unfortunate GSP's dominant win was overshadowed by the cornerman controversy. "Do I think that he got greased? Yeah, I do," White told The Canadian Press prior to the UFC 95 weigh-in Friday at the Dominion Theatre. "Absolutely, 100 percent, I think that that guy was rubbing grease on him. Do I think Georges was trying to cheat? Absolutely not at all, but that cornerman was rubbing grease on him; you cannot do that."

Prior to UFC 100, Beau Dure of USA Today stated that St-Pierre was possibly "the best in the world." At the event, St-Pierre defeated No. 1 contender Thiago Alves by unanimous decision (50–45, 50–44, and 50–45). Alves showed promise on his feet standing up in the fight, but St-Pierre's wrestling offensive, endurance, and ground control proved too much for the challenger and put St-Pierre en route to a unanimous decision victory, despite suffering a pulled groin muscle in the third round. While St-Pierre said in his post-fight interview that the injury was sustained in the third round, he later said on his blog that the injury in fact occurred in the fourth round. On July 18, 2009, it was revealed that St-Pierre's groin injury would not require surgery.

St-Pierre successfully defended his welterweight title against Dan Hardy on March 27, 2010, at UFC 111 which took place in Newark, New Jersey. St-Pierre dominated the fight with his wrestling. He caught Hardy in the first round with an armbar, but Hardy refused to tap and eventually fought out of the hold. In the fourth round St-Pierre caught Hardy in a kimura while in the reverse-mount position, but St-Pierre was again unable to finish Hardy before he was able to escape. St-Pierre went on to win the fight by unanimous decision (50–43, 50–44, and 50–45). After the fight, he stated that he was glad to win but was not impressed by his performance, stating that he wanted to finish the fight which fans agreed. St-Pierre received harsh criticism for stalling the fight against Hardy and not being able to finish him.

St-Pierre's next fight was a rematch against Josh Koscheck at UFC 124 where he won by unanimous decision (50–45, 50–45, and 50–45). St-Pierre once again dominated the fight, this time around by use of superior striking and accurate boxing. He landed a total of 55 jabs to Koscheck's head, with Joe Rogan stating that it was "the most jabs I've ever seen in an MMA fight." During the first round, Koscheck's right eye became very swollen from one of St-Pierre's jabs, and by the end of the fight, due to a broken orbital bone, his right eye was completely swollen shut. St-Pierre stated at the post-fight conference that his plan included catching Koscheck off-guard by striking with him rather than wrestling. Despite the eye injury, St-Pierre was unable to put Koscheck away.

UFC president Dana White stated that Jake Shields would be St-Pierre's next opponent and confirmed that the two would meet in the main event of UFC 129 on April 30, 2011, in Toronto. White suggested that if St-Pierre defeated Shields, it could mark a move to middleweight and a superfight against then UFC Middleweight Champion Anderson Silva. St-Pierre defeated Shields via unanimous decision (50–45, 48–47, and 48–47). When asked about fighting Silva during the post-fight interview, St-Pierre stated that he had no desire to pursue it.

St-Pierre received a 60-day medical suspension following his UFC 129 fight with Shields due to damage to his left eye. Two days after the fight, however, Firas Zahabi, St-Pierre's trainer, said that doctors had declared that his eye had not suffered any serious damage and that he would be able to resume training after 10 days.

At the UFC 129 post-fight press conference, UFC President Dana White stated that St-Pierre could next fight Strikeforce Welterweight champion Nick Diaz. "I've got to go talk him about boxing first, and then we'll see what happens there. It's an interesting fight," White said. "I was there live for that last fight and I was blown away by Nick Diaz's last fight. He looked incredible."

Dana White confirmed via Twitter that St-Pierre's next opponent would be Nick Diaz at UFC 137 at the Mandalay Bay Event Center in Las Vegas, Nevada. However, at the UFC 137 press conference, White announced that Carlos Condit would no longer face B.J. Penn and instead would replace Nick Diaz, who had failed to show up for any event related press appearances. Condit was to face St-Pierre for the UFC Welterweight Title at UFC 137. On October 18, 2011, it was announced that St-Pierre had pulled out of the fight due to a knee injury. After conferring with management and UFC officials, Condit elected not to compete against a replacement fighter at UFC 137, but face St-Pierre in early 2012. In a strange turn of events, Nick Diaz fought and defeated B.J. Penn at UFC 137 and UFC officials decided to have St-Pierre return and fight Diaz at UFC 143. According to White, St-Pierre said "He's [Nick Diaz] the most disrespectful human being I've ever met and I'm going to put the worst beating you've ever seen on him in the UFC."

However, on December 7, 2011, it was revealed St-Pierre had sustained a torn right ACL, an injury which would force him to be out for up to ten months, forcing him out of the bout with Diaz. At UFC 143, in a fight for the UFC Interim Welterweight Championship, Diaz lost to Condit.

St-Pierre was set to return and fight Condit for the undisputed championship on November 17, 2012, at UFC 154. On August 28, 2012, St-Pierre posted to his official Facebook page that he had the green light from his medical team to compete once again. He ended his post by announcing that his return would be in UFC 154, in which he was to fight Carlos Condit.

St-Pierre once again successfully defended his welterweight title on November 17, 2012, at UFC 154 against Condit, winning a unanimous decision (49–46, 50–45, and 50–45). Despite being badly hurt in the third round by a headkick, St-Pierre was able to take and hold down Condit repeatedly during the bout, while defending multiple submission attempts and delivering multiple strikes from Condit's active guard.  Both participants earned Fight of the Night honors for their performance.

Georges St-Pierre defended his title for the 8th time and defeated Nick Diaz at UFC 158 on March 16, 2013, by unanimous decision (50–45, 50–45, and 50–45).  In preparation for the bout, GSP retained well-known boxer Lucian Bute as a sparring partner.

St-Pierre faced Johny Hendricks on November 16, 2013, in the main event at UFC 167. St-Pierre won the fight by controversial split decision (47–48, 48–47, and 48–47), a win which UFC president Dana White stated was unwarranted immediately after the fight. Additionally, each of the sixteen MMA journalists' scorecards collected on MMADecisions.com showed a win for Hendricks. In his post-fight interview, St-Pierre said he would step away from fighting 'for a little bit'.

Vacating the title and MMA hiatus
St-Pierre officially announced on December 13, 2013, that he voluntarily vacated the title and needed to take some time off from MMA. He left the door open for a possible return to MMA in the future. In a 2021 interview he said he needed the break because of the high levels of performance-enhancing substances in the UFC, as well as requiring time to work through personal issues.

Via Twitter, St-Pierre announced on March 27, 2014, that he had torn his left ACL while training, further delaying a potential return to fighting.  The torn left ACL would require surgery. He was medically cleared to resume training on October 17, 2014, but it remained unclear if he had plans to fight professionally again. In 2015, St-Pierre played a key role in Rory MacDonald's preparation for his rematch with Robbie Lawler at UFC 189.

Return and retirement
St-Pierre announced on June 20, 2016, that he was re-negotiating his contract with the UFC with hopes of returning to the Octagon for December's UFC 206 in Toronto.

After months of negotiations, on February 15, 2017, St-Pierre and UFC reportedly agreed to financial terms of a multi-fight contract. The next day, UFC president Dana White confirmed St-Pierre had officially re-signed with the organization. In March 2017, St-Pierre revealed the contract was for four fights.

While on SportsCenter, Dana White confirmed that St-Pierre would make his return against UFC Middleweight Champion Michael Bisping sometime in 2017. On May 11, 2017, Dana White announced the fight had been canceled. The UFC and Bisping had wanted to have the fight at early July's UFC 213 but St-Pierre announced on his Instagram page that he had an eye injury and difficulty moving up a weight class would prevent him from fighting until November. During the post-fight conference at late July's UFC 214, Dana White stated the fight was back on.  White had intended for St-Pierre to fight current UFC Welterweight Champion Tyron Woodley. However White was critical of Woodley's performance in his last two fights and with Robert Whittaker, Bisping's next intended opponent, medically suspended until January 2018, White decided to return to the original plan.

The pairing with Bisping took place in the main event of UFC 217 on November 4, 2017, nearly four years since UFC 167, when GSP last fought. St-Pierre defeated Bisping via technical submission in the third round to become the Middleweight Champion and the fourth person in UFC history to become a champion in multiple divisions. This win earned St-Pierre his first Performance of the Night bonus award.   St-Pierre's return to the octagon set the record for the Canadian pay-per-view market, surpassing the Floyd Mayweather vs. Conor McGregor boxing match from August 2017. St-Pierre's win earned him the praise of Canadian Prime Minister Justin Trudeau.

On December 7, 2017, St-Pierre announced that he was vacating his UFC middleweight title after 34 days of holding the belt. Suffering from ulcerative colitis, St-Pierre wanted to avoid holding up the middleweight division.

After his win at UFC 223, UFC Lightweight Champion Khabib Nurmagomedov called out St-Pierre as his first title defense later in the year. St-Pierre declined, stating again that he was not medically fit to compete. In June, it was leaked that the UFC was attempting to book St-Pierre against Nate Diaz as the co-main event at UFC 227. St-Pierre confirmed he had been approached but declined by saying a match-up against Diaz did not interest him. In August, St-Pierre announced he was looking to return at the end of the year and was interested in dropping down to lightweight and fighting the winner of Khabib Nurmagomedov and Conor McGregor. Dana White said St-Pierre would not be fighting the winner of Nurmagomedov vs McGregor and White would request St-Pierre remain at welterweight.

On December 13, 2018, St-Pierre revealed on La Sueur podcast that he had recovered completely from ulcerative colitis, but had not yet decided whether or not he would return to fighting.

St-Pierre announced his official retirement on February 21, 2019, at a press conference at the Bell Centre in Montreal.

On May 9, 2020, UFC announced St-Pierre will be inducted into the Modern-Era Wing of the UFC Hall of Fame.

On 9 June 2021, Saint-Isidore honoured St-Pierre with the unveiling of a life-sized 136 kg bronze statue of himself, complete with a biography entitled “Place GSP”. The statue sits in an octagon representing the UFC cage with St-Pierre's eight core values engraved in French on the octagon floor: family, perseverance, wisdom, integrity, generosity, respect, creativity and honour.

Personal life
St-Pierre has founded a charity, the GSP Foundation, that aims to reduce bullying and encourage youth participation in sports.

St-Pierre has spoken about mental illness in interviews. He has stated that at the time of his first retirement he 'was in some kind of depression' and said in 2014 that he suffered from obsessive–compulsive disorder. He credited his OCD in being a factor in his success.

Championships and achievements

Kyokushin kaikan
 1992 All Canadian open Junior Kumite Champion
 1993 All Canadian open Junior Kumite Champion
 1994 All Canadian open Junior Kumite Finalist
 1995 All Canadian open Junior Kumite Champion
 1996 All Canadian open Junior Kumite Champion

Mixed martial arts
Ultimate Fighting Championship
UFC Hall of Fame (Modern-Era Wing, Class of 2020)
UFC Middleweight Championship (one time)
UFC Welterweight Championship (two times)
Nine title defenses
Interim UFC Welterweight Championship (one time, first)
Fight of the Night (four times) vs. Jon Fitch, Josh Koscheck, Carlos Condit, Johny Hendricks
Knockout of the Night (one time) vs. Matt Hughes
Submission of the Night (one time) vs. Matt Hughes
Performance of the Night (one time) vs. Michael Bisping
Most UFC welterweight title fights (14)
Second most wins in UFC welterweight division (19)
Most wins in UFC welterweight title fights (12)
Second most wins in UFC title fights (13)
Third most consecutive title defenses in the UFC history (9)
Fourth Multi-Divisional Champion in UFC History
Tied for second most wins by decision in UFC history (12) (with Diego Sanchez, Brad Tavares, Rafael dos Anjos and Andrei Arlovski)
Tied for second most unanimous decision wins in UFC history (10) (tied with Kamaru Usman, Frankie Edgar and Neil Magny)
Most takedowns in UFC history (90)
Most successful title defenses in the UFC welterweight division (9)
Most consecutive title defenses in the UFC welterweight division (9)
Black Belt Magazine
Fighter of the Year (2008)
Sherdog
Mixed Martial Arts Hall of Fame
2017 Comeback Fighter of the Year vs. Michael Bisping
MMAjunkie.com
 2009 Fighter of the Year
 2017 Comeback Fighter of the Year

Fight Matrix
Fighter of the Year (2009)
Fighter of the Year (2010)
2012 Comeback of the Year vs. Carlos Condit on November 17, 2012
2006 Most Noteworthy Match of Year vs. Matt Hughes on November 16, 2006
2007 Most Noteworthy Match of Year vs. Matt Serra on April 7, 2007
2009 Most Noteworthy Match of Year vs. B.J. Penn on January 31, 2009
Rogers Sportsnet
2008 Rogers Sportsnet Canadian Athlete of the Year
2009 Rogers Sportsnet Canadian Athlete of the Year
2010 Rogers Sportsnet Canadian Athlete of the Year
Spike Guys' Choice Awards
2010 Most Dangerous Man of the Year
Sports Illustrated (SI.com)
2009 Fighter of the Year
Wrestling Observer Newsletter awards
2013 Best Box Office Draw
2008 Most Outstanding Fighter
2009 Most Outstanding Fighter
2010 Most Outstanding Fighter
2011 MMA Most Valuable Fighter
2013 MMA Most Valuable Fighter
2017 MMA Most Valuable Fighter
World MMA Awards
2008 Submission of the Year vs. Matt Hughes at UFC 79
2009 Fighter of the Year
ESPY Award
2008 Nomination - Best Fighter ESPY Award
2010 Nomination - Best Fighter ESPY Award
2011 Nomination - Best Fighter ESPY Award 
2018 Nomination - Best Fighter ESPY Award

Mixed martial arts record

|-
|Win
|align=center|26–2
|Michael Bisping
|Technical Submission (rear-naked choke)
|UFC 217
|
|align=center|3
|align=center|4:23
|New York City, New York, United States
|
|-
| Win
| align=center| 25–2
| Johny Hendricks
| Decision (split)
| UFC 167
| 
| align=center| 5
| align=center| 5:00
| Las Vegas, Nevada, United States
| 
|-
| Win
| align=center| 24–2
| Nick Diaz
| Decision (unanimous)
| UFC 158
| 
| align=center| 5
| align=center| 5:00
| Montreal, Quebec, Canada
| 
|-
| Win
| align=center| 23–2
| Carlos Condit
| Decision (unanimous)
| UFC 154
| 
| align=center| 5
| align=center| 5:00
| Montreal, Quebec, Canada
| 
|-
| Win
| align=center| 22–2
| Jake Shields
| Decision (unanimous)
| UFC 129
| 
| align=center| 5
| align=center| 5:00
| Toronto, Ontario, Canada
| 
|-
| Win
| align=center| 21–2
| Josh Koscheck
| Decision (unanimous)
| UFC 124
| 
| align=center| 5
| align=center| 5:00
| Montreal, Quebec, Canada
| 
|-
| Win
| align=center| 20–2
| Dan Hardy
| Decision (unanimous)
| UFC 111
| 
| align=center| 5
| align=center| 5:00
| Newark, New Jersey, United States
| 
|-
| Win
| align=center| 19–2
| Thiago Alves
| Decision (unanimous)
| UFC 100
| 
| align=center| 5
| align=center| 5:00
| Las Vegas, Nevada, United States
| 
|-
|  Win
| align=center| 18–2
| B.J. Penn
| TKO (corner stoppage)
| UFC 94
| 
| align=center| 4
| align=center| 5:00
| Las Vegas, Nevada, United States
| 
|-
| Win
| align=center| 17–2
| Jon Fitch
| Decision (unanimous)
| UFC 87
| 
| align=center| 5
| align=center| 5:00
| Minneapolis, Minnesota, United States
| 
|-
| Win
| align=center| 16–2
| Matt Serra
| TKO (knees to the body)
| UFC 83
| 
| align=center| 2
| align=center| 4:45
| Montreal, Quebec, Canada
| 
|-
| Win
| align=center| 15–2
| Matt Hughes
| Submission (armbar)
| UFC 79
| 
| align=center| 2
| align=center| 4:54
| Las Vegas, Nevada, United States
| 
|-
| Win
| align=center| 14–2
| Josh Koscheck
| Decision (unanimous)
| UFC 74
| 
| align=center| 3
| align=center| 5:00
| Las Vegas, Nevada, United States
| 
|-
| Loss
| align=center| 13–2
| Matt Serra
| TKO (punches)
| UFC 69
| 
| align=center| 1
| align=center| 3:25
| Houston, Texas, United States
| 
|-
| Win
| align=center| 13–1
| Matt Hughes
| TKO (head kick and punches)
| UFC 65
| 
| align=center| 2
| align=center| 1:25
| Sacramento, California, United States
| 
|-
| Win
| align=center| 12–1
| B.J. Penn
| Decision (split)
| UFC 58
| 
| align=center| 3
| align=center| 5:00
| Las Vegas, Nevada, United States
|
|-
| Win
| align=center| 11–1
| Sean Sherk
| TKO (punches and elbows)
| UFC 56
| 
| align=center| 2
| align=center| 2:53
| Las Vegas, Nevada, United States
| 
|-
| Win
| align=center| 10–1
| Frank Trigg
| Submission (rear-naked choke)
| UFC 54
| 
| align=center| 1
| align=center| 4:09
| Las Vegas, Nevada, United States
| 
|-
| Win
| align=center| 9–1
| Jason Miller
| Decision (unanimous)
| UFC 52
| 
| align=center| 3
| align=center| 5:00
| Las Vegas, Nevada, United States
| 
|-
| Win
| align=center| 8–1
| Dave Strasser
| Submission (kimura)
| TKO 19: Rage
| 
| align=center| 1
| align=center| 1:52
| Montreal, Quebec, Canada
| 
|-
| Loss
| align=center| 7–1
| Matt Hughes
| Submission (armbar)
| UFC 50
| 
| align=center| 1
| align=center| 4:59
| Atlantic City, New Jersey, United States
| 
|-
| Win
| align=center| 7–0
| Jay Hieron
| TKO (punches)
| UFC 48
| 
| align=center| 1
| align=center| 1:42
| Las Vegas, Nevada, United States
| 
|-
| Win
| align=center| 6–0
| Karo Parisyan
| Decision (unanimous)
| UFC 46
| 
| align=center| 3
| align=center| 5:00
| Las Vegas, Nevada, United States
| 
|-
| Win
| align=center| 5–0
| Pete Spratt
| Submission (rear-naked choke)
| TKO 14: Road Warriors
| 
| align=center| 1
| align=center| 3:40
| Victoriaville, Quebec, Canada
| 
|-
| Win
| align=center| 4–0
| Thomas Denny
| TKO (cut)
| UCC 12: Adrenaline
| 
| align=center| 2
| align=center| 4:45
| Montreal, Quebec, Canada
|
|-
| Win
| align=center| 3–0
| Travis Galbraith
| TKO (elbows)
| UCC 11: The Next Level
| 
| align=center| 1
| align=center| 2:03
| Montreal, Quebec, Canada
| 
|-
| Win
| align=center| 2–0
| Justin Bruckmann
| Submission (armbar)
| UCC 10: Battles
| 
| align=center| 1
| align=center| 3:53
| Gatineau, Quebec, Canada
| 
|-
| Win
| align=center| 1–0
| Ivan Menjivar
| TKO (punches)
| UCC 7: Bad Boyz
| 
| align=center| 1
| align=center| 4:59
| Montreal, Quebec, Canada
|

Submission grappling record

Pay-per-view bouts
{|class="wikitable sortable"
!No
!Event
!Fight
!Date
!Venue
!City
!PPV buys
|-
|1.
|UFC 65
|Hughes vs. St-Pierre 2
|18 November 2006
|ARCO Arena
|Sacramento, California, U.S 
|500,000
|-
|2.
|UFC 69
|St-Pierre vs. Serra
|7 April 2007
|Toyota Center
|Houston, Texas, U.S
|400,000
|-
|3.
|UFC 79
|St-Pierre vs. Hughes 3
|29 December 2007
|Mandalay Bay Events Center
|Las Vegas, Nevada, U.S
|650,000
|-
|4.
|UFC 83
|St-Pierre vs. Serra 2
|19 April 2008
|Bell Centre
|Montreal, Quebec, Canada
|530,000
|-
|5.
|UFC 87
|St-Pierre vs. Fitch
|9 August 2008
|Target Center
|Minneapolis, Minnesota, U.S 
|625,000
|-
|6.
|UFC 94
|St-Pierre vs. Penn 2
|31 January 2009
|MGM Grand Garden Arena
|Las Vegas, Nevada, U.S
|920,000
|-
|7.
|UFC 111
|St-Pierre vs. Hardy
|27 March 2010
|Prudential Center
|Newark, New Jersey, U.S
|770,000
|-
|8.
|UFC 124
|St-Pierre vs. Koscheck 2
|11 December 2010
|Bell Centre
|Montreal, Quebec, Canada
|800,000
|-
|9.
|UFC 129
|St-Pierre vs. Shields
|30 April 2011
|Rogers Center
|Toronto, Ontario, Canada
|800,000
|-
|10.
|UFC 154
|St-Pierre vs. Condit
|17 November 2012
|Bell Centre
|Montreal, Quebec, Canada
|700,000
|-
|11.
|UFC 158 
|St-Pierre vs. Diaz
|16 March 2013
|Bell Centre
|Montreal, Quebec, Canada
|950,000
|-
|12.
|UFC 167
|St-Pierre vs. Hendricks
|16 November 2013
|MGM Grand Garden Arena
|Las Vegas, Nevada, U.S
|630,000
|-
|13.
|UFC 217
|Bisping vs. St-Pierre
|4 November 2017
|Madison Square Garden
|New York City, New York, U.S
|875,000
|-
! colspan="6" |Total sales
! 9,150,000

Filmography

Film

Television

See also
 List of UFC champions
 List of current UFC fighters
 List of male mixed martial artists
 List of Canadian UFC fighters

References

External links

1981 births
Canadian male mixed martial artists
Canadian practitioners of Brazilian jiu-jitsu
Canadian submission wrestlers
Canadian male karateka
Canadian Muay Thai practitioners
Canadian male film actors
Living people
Ultimate Fighting Championship champions
Welterweight mixed martial artists
Middleweight mixed martial artists
Mixed martial artists utilizing Kyokushin kaikan
Mixed martial artists utilizing Shidōkan
Mixed martial artists utilizing Muay Thai
Mixed martial artists utilizing Gaidojutsu
Mixed martial artists utilizing Brazilian jiu-jitsu
People awarded a black belt in Brazilian jiu-jitsu
French Quebecers
People from Montérégie
Canadian people of French descent
Ultimate Fighting Championship male fighters